Whip It On is the debut mini-album of The Raveonettes. It was released on 6 August 2002. Every song is in the key of B-flat minor in contrast to the follow-up album Chain Gang of Love, which is almost entirely in the key of B-flat major. Each song also features only three chords.

The artwork for the album is a photograph taken by Søren Solkær Starbird.

Reception

The album received generally positive reviews upon its release. At Metacritic, which assigns a normalised rating out of 100 to reviews from mainstream critics, the album received an average score of 70, based on 15 reviews, which indicates "Generally favorable reviews".

Track listing

References

2002 debut EPs
The Raveonettes albums